“Think Positive” is a Lebanese association (Registration number 958) established in 2009 by young activists who have been working hard to serve their society by raising awareness among youths and marginalized groups.
It started its activities with fighting HIV/AIDS, Drug Use, Sexually Transmitted Diseases and Stigma and Discrimination.
It has launched the regional campaign against HIV+ Phobia in collaboration with 10 partners at International, Regional and National levels and conducted many activities and projects under the main theme of the campaign.

Vision
Think Positive aims at counseling youths, women, and marginalized groups (people living with HIV/AIDS, people who use drugs, men who have sex with men, and female sex workers) in the Lebanese society to build their capacities at social and behavioral levels in order to cope with major challenges including drug use, HIV/AIDS, sexually transmitted diseases, and social isolation by empowering and involving them in the core of the social work process.

“HIV+ Phobia” campaign
The organization started implementing the activities of its regional campaign against “HIV+ Phobia” on October 15, 2009 in Lebanon, Jordan and Saudi Arabia, in collaboration with the Lebanese NAP, the Jordanian NAP, The Saudi association for People Living with HIV (PLHIV), Bushra Center (Jordan), Global Network of PLHIV (GNP+), World AIDS Campaign (WAC), dance for life international, UNDP, UNFPA and Y-Peer.

Various social and lobbying activities were implemented in the three countries such as Wall Street advertisement, signature collecting for better acceptance of people living with HIV in their societies, lectures in schools and universities and other activities.

Think Positive also sought new partners in other countries in the Middle East and North Africa region in coordination with its main partners.

Goals
Think Positive aims to empower its target groups to be highly active in the social and health care systems at national level by building their capacities and skills to answer their daily needs under the umbrella of the Universal Declaration of Human Rights and the Millennium Development Goals (MDGs) of the United Nations.

Programs
 HIV/AIDS & STD’s Program.
 Social and Behavioral Empowerment Program.
 “Celebrating our Rights” Program.
 “Communicating Human Rights” Program.

Services
 Capacity Building and Training Sessions.
 Social Media Training Sessions.
 Counseling.
 Voluntary Counseling and Testing.

See also
 People With AIDS — self-empowering movement
 AIDS advocacy
 HIV and AIDS misconceptions

References
 Think Positive
 [Think Positive Organization is officially registered in the Lebanese ministry of interior under the number 958]

2009 establishments in Lebanon
Organizations established in 2009
HIV/AIDS organizations
Medical and health organisations based in Lebanon